The House Committee on Un-American Activities (HCUA), popularly dubbed the House Un-American Activities Committee (HUAC), was an investigative committee of the United States House of Representatives, created in 1938 to investigate alleged disloyalty and subversive activities on the part of private citizens, public employees, and those organizations suspected of having either fascist or communist ties. It became a standing (permanent) committee in 1945, and from 1969 onwards it was known as the House Committee on Internal Security. When the House abolished the committee in 1975, its functions were transferred to the House Judiciary Committee.

The committee's anti-communist investigations are often associated with McCarthyism, although Joseph McCarthy himself (as a U.S. Senator) had no direct involvement with the House committee. McCarthy was the chairman of the Government Operations Committee and its Permanent Subcommittee on Investigations of the U.S. Senate, not the House.

History

Precursors to the committee

Overman Committee (1918–1919)

The Overman Committee was a subcommittee of the Senate Judiciary Committee chaired by North Carolina Democratic Senator Lee Slater Overman that operated from September 1918 to June 1919. The subcommittee investigated German as well as "Bolshevik elements" in the United States.

This subcommittee was originally concerned with investigating pro-German sentiments in the American liquor industry. After World War I ended in November 1918, and the German threat lessened, the subcommittee began investigating Bolshevism, which had appeared as a threat during the First Red Scare after the Russian Revolution in 1917. The subcommittee's hearing into Bolshevik propaganda, conducted February 11 to March 10, 1919, had a decisive role in constructing an image of a radical threat to the United States during the first Red Scare.

Fish Committee (1930)
U.S. Representative Hamilton Fish III (R-NY), who was a fervent anti-communist, introduced, on May 5, 1930, House Resolution 180, which proposed to establish a committee to investigate communist activities in the United States. The resulting committee, Special Committee to Investigate Communist Activities in the United States commonly known as the Fish Committee, undertook extensive investigations of people and organizations suspected of being involved with or supporting communist activities in the United States. Among the committee's targets were the American Civil Liberties Union and communist presidential candidate William Z. Foster. The committee recommended granting the United States Department of Justice more authority to investigate communists, and strengthening of immigration and deportation laws to keep communists out of the United States.

McCormack–Dickstein Committee (1934–1937)
From 1934 to 1937, The committee, now named the Special Committee on Un-American Activities Authorized to Investigate Nazi Propaganda and Certain Other Propaganda Activities, chaired by John William McCormack (D-Mass.) and Samuel Dickstein (D-NY), held public and private hearings and collected testimony filling 4,300 pages. The Special Committee was widely known as the McCormack–Dickstein committee. Its mandate was to get "information on how foreign subversive propaganda entered the U.S. and the organizations that were spreading it." Its records are held by the National Archives and Records Administration as records related to HUAC.

In 1934, the Special Committee subpoenaed most of the leaders of the fascist movement in the United States. Beginning in November 1934, the committee investigated allegations of a fascist plot to seize the White House, known as the "Business Plot". Contemporary newspapers widely reported the plot as a hoax. However contemporary sources and some of those involved, such as Gen. Smedley Butler, confirmed the validity of such a plot.

It has been reported that while Dickstein served on this committee and the subsequent Special investigation Committee, he was paid $1,250 a month by the Soviet NKVD, which hoped to get secret congressional information on anti-communists and pro-fascists. A 1939 NKVD report stated Dickstein handed over "materials on the war budget for 1940, records of conferences of the budget subcommission, reports of the war minister, chief of staff and etc." However the NKVD was dissatisfied with the amount of information provided by Dickstein, after he was not appointed to HUAC to "carry out measures planned by us together with him." Dickstein unsuccessfully attempted to expedite the deportation of Soviet defector Walter Krivitsky, while the Dies Committee kept him in the country. Dickstein stopped receiving NKVD payments in February 1940.

Dies Committee (1938–1944) 

On May 26, 1938, the House Committee on Un-American Activities was established as a special investigating committee, reorganized from its previous incarnations as the Fish Committee and the McCormack–Dickstein Committee, to investigate alleged disloyalty and subversive activities on the part of private citizens, public employees, and those organizations suspected of having communist or fascist ties; however, it concentrated its efforts on communists. It was chaired by Martin Dies Jr. (D-Tex.), and therefore known as the Dies Committee. Its records are held by the National Archives and Records Administration as records related to HUAC.

In 1938, Hallie Flanagan, the head of the Federal Theatre Project, was subpoenaed to appear before the committee to answer the charge the project was overrun with communists. Flanagan was called to testify for only a part of one day, while an administrative clerk from the project was called in for two entire days. It was during this investigation that one of the committee members, Joe Starnes (D-Ala.), famously asked Flanagan whether the English Elizabethan era playwright Christopher Marlowe was a member of the Communist Party, and mused that ancient Greek tragedian "Mr. Euripides" preached class warfare.

In 1939, the committee investigated people involved with pro-Nazi organizations such as Oscar C. Pfaus and George Van Horn Moseley. Moseley testified before the committee for five hours about a "Jewish Communist conspiracy" to take control of the US government. Moseley was supported by Donald Shea of the American Gentile League, whose statement was deleted from the public record as the committee found it so objectionable.

The committee also put together an argument for the internment of Japanese Americans known as the "Yellow Report". Organized in response to rumors of Japanese Americans being coddled by the War Relocation Authority (WRA) and news that some former inmates would be allowed to leave camp and Nisei soldiers to return to the West Coast, the committee investigated charges of fifth column activity in the camps. A number of anti-WRA arguments were presented in subsequent hearings, but Director Dillon Myer debunked the more inflammatory claims. The investigation was presented to the 77th Congress, and alleged that certain cultural traits – Japanese loyalty to the Emperor, the number of Japanese fishermen in the US, and the Buddhist faith – were evidence for Japanese espionage. With the exception of Rep. Herman Eberharter (D-Pa.), the members of the committee seemed to support internment, and its recommendations to expedite the impending segregation of "troublemakers", establish a system to investigate applicants for leave clearance, and step up Americanization and assimilation efforts largely coincided with WRA goals.

In 1946, the committee considered opening investigations into the Ku Klux Klan, but decided against doing so, prompting white supremacist committee member John E. Rankin (D-Miss.) to remark, "After all, the KKK is an old American institution." Instead of the Klan, HUAC concentrated on investigating the possibility that the American Communist Party had infiltrated the Works Progress Administration, including the Federal Theatre Project and the Federal Writers' Project. Twenty years later, in 1965–1966, however, the committee did conduct an investigation into Klan activities under chairman Edwin Willis (D-La.).

Standing Committee (1945–1975)

The House Committee on Un-American Activities became a standing (permanent) committee in 1945. Democratic Representative Edward J. Hart of New Jersey became the committee's first chairman. Under the mandate of Public Law 601, passed by the 79th Congress, the committee of nine representatives investigated suspected threats of subversion or propaganda that attacked "the form of government as guaranteed by our Constitution".

Under this mandate, the committee focused its investigations on real and suspected communists in positions of actual or supposed influence in the United States society. A significant step for HUAC was its investigation of the charges of espionage brought against Alger Hiss in 1948. This investigation ultimately resulted in Hiss's trial and conviction for perjury, and convinced many of the usefulness of congressional committees for uncovering communist subversion.

The chief investigator was Robert E. Stripling, senior investigator Louis J. Russell, and investigators Alvin Williams Stokes, Courtney E. Owens, and Donald T. Appell.  The director of research was Benjamin Mandel.

Hollywood blacklist

In 1947, the committee held nine days of hearings into alleged communist propaganda and influence in the Hollywood motion picture industry. After conviction on contempt of Congress charges for refusal to answer some questions posed by committee members, "The Hollywood Ten" were blacklisted by the industry. Eventually, more than 300 artists – including directors, radio commentators, actors, and particularly screenwriters – were boycotted by the studios. Some, like Charlie Chaplin, Orson Welles, Alan Lomax, Paul Robeson, and Yip Harburg, left the U.S or went underground to find work. Others like Dalton Trumbo wrote under pseudonyms or the names of colleagues. Only about ten percent succeeded in rebuilding careers within the entertainment industry.

In 1947, studio executives told the committee that wartime films—such as Mission to Moscow, The North Star, and Song of Russia—could be considered pro-Soviet propaganda, but claimed that the films were valuable in the context of the Allied war effort, and that they were made (in the case of Mission to Moscow) at the request of White House officials. In response to the House investigations, most studios produced a number of anti-communist and anti-Soviet propaganda films such as The Red Menace (August 1949), The Red Danube (October 1949), The Woman on Pier 13 (October 1949), Guilty of Treason (May 1950, about the ordeal and trial of Cardinal József Mindszenty), I Was a Communist for the FBI (May 1951, Academy Award nominated for best documentary 1951, also serialized for radio), Red Planet Mars (May 1952), and John Wayne's Big Jim McLain (August 1952). Universal-International Pictures was the only major studio that did not purposefully produce such a film.

Whittaker Chambers and Alger Hiss 

On July 31, 1948, the committee heard testimony from Elizabeth Bentley, an American who had been working as a Soviet agent in New York. Among those whom she named as communists was Harry Dexter White, a senior U.S. Treasury department official. The committee subpoenaed Whittaker Chambers on August 3, 1948. Chambers, too, was a former Soviet spy, by then a senior editor of Time magazine.

Chambers named more than a half-dozen government officials including White as well as Alger Hiss (and Hiss' brother Donald). Most of these former officials refused to answer committee questions, citing the Fifth Amendment. White denied the allegations, and died of a heart attack a few days later. Hiss also denied all charges; doubts about his testimony though, especially those expressed by freshman Congressman Richard Nixon, led to further investigation that strongly suggested Hiss had made a number of false statements.

Hiss challenged Chambers to repeat his charges outside a Congressional committee, which Chambers did. Hiss then sued for libel, leading Chambers to produce copies of State Department documents which he claimed Hiss had given him in 1938. Hiss denied this before a grand jury, was indicted for perjury, and subsequently convicted and imprisoned.
The present-day House of Representatives website on HUAC states, "But in the 1990s, Soviet archives conclusively revealed that Hiss had been a spy on the Kremlin’s payroll." However, in the 1990s senior soviet intelligence officials, after consulting their archive, stated they found nothing to support that theory. The 1995 Venona papers have been claimed as providing overwhelming evidence that he was a spy, but while many have conceded the matter, the evidence available is entirely circumstantial  such that it remains a matter of debate. Given how many documents remain classified, it is unlikely that a truly conclusive answer will ever be reached.

Decline

In the wake of the downfall of McCarthy (who never served in the House, nor on HUAC), the prestige of HUAC began a gradual decline in the late 1950s. By 1959, the committee was being denounced by former President Harry S. Truman as the "most un-American thing in the country today".

In May 1960, the committee held hearings in San Francisco City Hall which led to the infamous riot on May 13, when city police officers fire-hosed protesting students from the UC Berkeley, Stanford, and other local colleges, and dragged them down the marble steps beneath the rotunda, leaving some seriously injured. Soviet affairs expert William Mandel, who had been subpoenaed to testify, angrily denounced the committee and the police in a blistering statement which was aired repeatedly for years thereafter on Pacifica Radio station KPFA in Berkeley. An anti-communist propaganda film, Operation Abolition, was produced by the committee from subpoenaed local news reports, and shown around the country during 1960 and 1961. In response, the Northern California ACLU produced a film called Operation Correction, which discussed falsehoods in the first film. Scenes from the hearings and protest were later featured in the Academy Award-nominated 1990 documentary Berkeley in the Sixties.

The committee lost considerable prestige as the 1960s progressed, increasingly becoming the target of political satirists and the defiance of a new generation of political activists. HUAC subpoenaed Jerry Rubin and Abbie Hoffman of the Yippies in 1967, and again in the aftermath of the 1968 Democratic National Convention. The Yippies used the media attention to make a mockery of the proceedings. Rubin came to one session dressed as a Revolutionary War soldier and passed out copies of the United States Declaration of Independence to those in attendance. Rubin then "blew giant gum bubbles, while his co-witnesses taunted the committee with Nazi salutes". Rubin attended another session dressed as Santa Claus. On another occasion, police stopped Hoffman at the building entrance and arrested him for wearing the United States flag. Hoffman quipped to the press, "I regret that I have but one shirt to give for my country", paraphrasing the last words of revolutionary patriot Nathan Hale; Rubin, who was wearing a matching Viet Cong flag, shouted that the police were communists for not arresting him as well.

Hearings in August 1966 called to investigate anti-Vietnam War activities were disrupted by hundreds of protesters, many from the Progressive Labor Party. The committee faced witnesses who were openly defiant.

According to The Harvard Crimson:

In an attempt to reinvent itself, the committee was renamed as the Internal Security Committee in 1969.

Termination

The House Committee on Internal Security was formally terminated on January 14, 1975, the day of the opening of the 94th Congress. The committee's files and staff were transferred on that day to the House Judiciary Committee.

Chairmen
Source:

Martin Dies Jr., (D-Tex.), 1938–1944
Edward J. Hart (D-N.J.), 1945–1946
J. Parnell Thomas (R-N.J.), 1947–1948
John Stephens Wood (D-Ga.), 1949–1953
Harold H. Velde (R-Ill.), 1953–1955
Francis E. Walter (D-Pa.), 1955–1963
Edwin E. Willis (D-La.), 1963–1969
Richard Howard Ichord Jr. (D-Mo.), 1969–1975

Notable members

 Felix Edward Hébert
 Donald L. Jackson
 Noah M. Mason
 Karl E. Mundt
 Richard Nixon
 John E. Rankin
 Gordon H. Scherer
 Richard B. Vail
 Jerry Voorhis

See also

 California Senate Factfinding Subcommittee on Un-American Activities
 Defending Dissent Foundation
 J. Edgar Hoover
 Loyalty oath
 Manning Johnson
 McCarran Internal Security Act
 Edward S. Montgomery
 Mundt–Ferguson Communist Registration Bill
 Mundt–Nixon Bill
 Red-baiting
 Subversive Activities Control Board
 Wilkinson v. United States

References

Works cited

Further reading

Archives
Investigation of un-American propaganda activities in the United States. Hearings before a Special Committee on Un-American Activities, House of Representatives (1938–1944), Volumes 1–17 with Appendices. University of Pennsylvania online gateway to Internet Archive and Hathi Trust.
United States House Committee on Internal Security University of Pennsylvania online gateway to Internet Archive and Hathi Trust.
 Schamel, Gharles E. Inventory of records of the Special Committee on Un-American activities, 1938–1944 (the Dies committee). Center for Legislative Archives, National Archives and Records Administration. Washington, D.C., July 1995.
 Schamel, Gharles E. Records of the House Un-American Activities committee, 1945–1969, renamed the House Internal Security committee, 1969–1976. Center for Legislative Archives, National Archives and Records Administration. Washington, D.C., July 1995.

Books

 Caballero, Raymond. McCarthyism vs. Clinton Jencks. Norman: University of Oklahoma Press, 2019.
 

 

→
→

Articles

"Operation Abolition", Time magazine, March 17, 1961

External links

 
 
 History.House.gov HUAC – permanent standing House Committee on Un-American Activities
 History.House.gov HUAC – 1948 Alger Hiss-Whittaker Chambers hearing before HUAC
 Eastern Carolina University Libraries: The Cold War and Internal Security Collection (CWIS): HUAC
 Un-American Activities Committee The Spartacus Educational website, UK
 House Unamerican Activities Committee (HUAC) Collection: Pamphlets collected by HUAC, many of which the committee deemed "un-American". (4,000 pamphlets). From the Rare Book and Special Collections Division at the Library of Congress
 

1938 establishments in Washington, D.C.
1975 disestablishments in Washington, D.C.
Anti-communist organizations in the United States
Cold War history of the United States
Un-American activities
McCarthyism
Political repression in the United States
Government agencies established in 1938
Anti-fascist organizations in the United States